Shark Island Productions is a documentary film production company based in Sydney, Australia, established in 2001 by Ian Darling. creates extensive education, outreach and community engagement campaigns with its films. It is the production arm of Shark Island Institute.

Through Shark Island Institute, the company builds partnerships with foundations, philanthropists, and not-for-profit organisations to raise awareness and make a social impact.
The organisation partnered with BRITDOC and the Sundance Documentary Film Program to bring GoodPitch2 Australia to the Sydney Opera House in 2014, 2015 and 2016, an international forum that connect filmmakers with foundations, financiers, not-for-profits, philanthropists and policy-makers. Money is raised in philanthropic grants for funding social impact documentaries and powerful strategic partnerships between community groups, the corporate sector, NGOs and policy-makers are formed.

Supported documentaries from the Good Pitch slate include That Sugar Film, Frackman, Gayby Baby, Zach's Ceremony, The Hunting Ground,  Whiteley (about Australian artist Brett Whiteley) and Constance On the Edge.

Shark Island Institute works with international documentary filmmakers in The Portfolio, resulting in films such as The Hunting Ground, The Bleeding Edge, The Fourth Estate, Inventing Tomorrow, 2040, Unrest, How to Change the World and Bully.

Shark Island Productions is a certified B corporation Company that meets standards of social and environmental performance, and is carbon-neutral since 2014.

Films

The Final Quarter (2019)
The film premiered at the Sydney Film Festival and then went to broadcast with Channel 10, Australia.

Accolades

Official Selection at the Sydney Film Festival 2019, with 5 further 'on-demand' screenings.  Official Selection 2019 Perth International Film Festival; Castlemaine Documentary Film Festival July 2019.

CH10 Broadcast date: 18 July 2019

Won Best Editing in a Documentary AACTA, Won Best Reporting of an Issue in Sport, Sporting Australia 2019 Media Awards, Won Best Documentary  -  Grand Final and Regional, 2019 Asian Academy Creative Awards, Won Racism It Stops With Me - Australian Human Rights Commission Award 2019, Won Best Documentary Film Critics Circle of Australia 2019,  Won Best Editing in a Documentary Feature Australian Screen Editors Guild 2019, Nominee Best Sound in a Documentary Australian  Screen Sound Guild 2019, Nominee Best Documentary AACTA Awards 2019, Finalist Walkley Awards for Excellence in Journalism - Documentary, Finalist  Screen Producers Australia Awards 2019 Feature Documentary of the Year.

Life After The Oasis (2019)
Life After The Oasis reflects on the last decade with original participants from The Oasis.

Premiered at  the 2019 Sydney Film Festival.

SBS Broadcast date: 10 November 2019

Suzy & The Simple Man (2016)
Accolades
Official Selection at the Sydney Film Festival 2016 (Premiere)
Official Selection at the Melbourne International Film Festival 2016
Official Selection at Mountainfilm 2017
Official Selection at the Byron Bay Film Festival 2017
Official Selection at the Earth Talks International Film Festival 2017
Official Selection at the Balinale International Film Festival 2017
Official Selection at the Wild & Scenic Film Festival 2018

Stories From The Inside (2013)
A group of first time offenders reveal the crimes that led to their incarceration into the Youth Unit at Port Phillip Prison.
The inmates tell their stories around the choices, mistakes and the effects of their actions on themselves, families and victims, and discuss the harsh reality of prison life, the daily grind, boredom, depression and the fear of rejection when they return to the outside world. Made in association with Igniting Change the film and study guide is made available as a free resource for all schools in Australia.

Paul Kelly - Stories of Me (2012)

ABC Broadcast date: 27 October 2012

Accolades

Won Best Sound in a Documentary Australian Screen Sound Guild 2013, Won Best Documentary Arts and Best Educational/Training resource (Primary/Secondary) ATOM Awards 2013, Won Best Documentary Film Critics Circle of Australia 2012, Won Best Editing in a Documentary Feature Australian Screen Editors Guild 2012, Nominated Best Documentary Feature Australian Directors Guild Awards 2013, Nominated Best Sound in a Documentary AACTA Awards 2013, Official Selection at the Melbourne International Film Festival 2012, Official Selection at the Canberra International Film Festival 2012.

The Soldier (2011)

Accolades

2012 official selection and Best Australian Documentary 'Special Mention' at the Antenna Documentary Festival.

Polly and Me (2010)
An 8-year-old girl lives alone with her mother and dreams of a better life beyond the walls of their small and dingy apartment. Isolated and lonely, the girl's only friend is her doll, Polly.

The film was launched on ABC Television during Child Protection Week followed by a live audience discussion hosted by Geraldine Doogue.

Polly and Me is endorsed by leading family and child abuse prevention organisations including: Australian Research Alliance for Children and Youth (ARACY), Benevolent Society, CREATE Foundation, Good Beginnings, Families Australia, Lighthouse Foundation, Lou's Place, Mirabel Foundation, National Association for Prevention of Child Abuse and Neglect (NAPCAN), The Salvation Army and The Smith Family.

ABC Broadcast date: 9 September 2010

Accolades

Nominated Best Achievement in Sound for a Short Fiction Film ASSG Award 2010.

Wall Boy (2010)
Accolades

2010 Nicola Daley for Cinematography - Fiction Drama Shorts at the Australian Cinematographers Society. Official Selection at Santa Barbara Film Festival, Ojai Film Festival, L.A Shortsfest, NYC International Film Festival, Korea Asiana Film Festival.

The Oasis (2008)
The Oasis was filmed over two years at The Oasis Youth Support Network refuge run by the Salvation Army in Surry Hills, Australia. On any night in Australia, 22,000 teenagers are homeless. This film follows Captain Paul Moulds and Robbin Moulds and their interactions with the youths using the refuge. The stories take an unflinching look at the difficulties and triumphs that happen each day and night. Many of these young people have ongoing problems with drug abuse; some of them can be violent, abusive and out of control; some of them seem resistant to attempts to help. But whatever is happening in their lives, Paul and Robbin Moulds are there to work with them to assist in turning lives around through supporting them, however often they fall down.

In 2011 The Oasis Homeless Short Film Competition was launched by patron Cate Blanchett, encouraging youth to make a three-minute film about any aspect of homelessness.

ABC Broadcast date: 10 April 2008

Accolades

Won.
Best Direction in a Documentary, Best Editing in a Documentary, AFI Awards 2008, Best Tertiary Education Resource and Best Educational Multi-Modal Production ATOM Awards 2008, Special Jury Prize FIFO.

Nominated.
Finalist: Best Documentary General ATOM Awards 2008, Best Documentary Human Story ATOM Awards 2008, Best Documentary Social and Political Issues ATOM Awards 2008, Best Education Multimodal Production ATOM Awards 2008, Best Documentary Logie Awards 2009, Finalist: Walkley Awards 2008, Best Documentary and Best Sound non-feature AFI Awards 2008, Best Direction ADG Awards 2008, Best Documentary IF Awards 2008, Social Justice Award for Documentary Santa Barbara International Film Festival 2009.

In The Company of Actors (2007)

It was broadcast in Australia on ABC1 February 2008.

Education and Outreach

The film and study guide package was donated to English, Drama and Media departments in all secondary schools across Australia with support from the Caledonia Foundation.

ABC Broadcast date: 7 February 2008

Accolades

Official Selection 
Sydney Film Festival in 2007; Melbourne International Film Festival, Vancouver International Film Festival, St Tropez Internationales du Cinema des Antiodes, Santa Barbara International Film Festival, Mumbai International Film Festival, OzFliz Ontario, The London Australian Film Festival, River Run International Film Festival.

Alone Across Australia (2003)
Alone Across Australia has won more than 25 awards, and has screened at over 60 international film festivals. It was recently listed as one of the 20 Best Adventure DVDs of all Time by Men's Journal magazine in the US.

ABC Broadcast date: 8 September 2004

Accolades

Audience Award Best Feature Documentary at San Francisco Documentary Film Festival, Crystal Heart Award Heartland Film Festival; Best Mountain Film and People's Choice Award Banff 2004,  Best Adventure Feature, People's Choice Award, Flagstaff Mountain Film Festival Arizona 2005; Special Jury Prize, Santa Barbara International Film Festival; Best Adventure Film, Moscow; Voted one of the "20 Best Adventure Films of All Time" Men's journal Magazine, USA, Winner of 32 International Film Festival Awards and Official Selection in over 30 Film Festivals around the world.

Woodstock for Capitalists (2001)
Three days of love and worship. A millionaire's convention in Omaha, Nebraska – probably the largest gathering of private wealth at any one time, anywhere in the world – but it's not about money.
It is an event surrounded by ritual, adulation and a fair degree of cult worship. 15,000 fanatical shareholders gather to pay homage to their hero Warren Buffett (the World's second richest man), as one man searches for the reasons why.

ABC Broadcast date: 15 March 2001

Accolades
CINE Golden Eagle Award, CINE Awards 2001; Official selection Hot Springs Documentary Film Festival 2001; Columbus International Film Festival; York Independent Film Festival; Pennsylvania Film Festival; Newport International Film Festival; Maui Film Festival; Tahoe International Film Festival.

Awards

Social impact
All Shark Island Productions films have education and outreach initiatives built around them. 
The Documentary film The Oasis had the most extensive outreach campaign of any film made in Australia and The Oasis Initiative was listed as one of Top 50 Philanthropic Gifts of All Time by Pro Bono Australia in 2013. The issue of youth homelessness in Australia gained national media attention in Youth Week 2008 via the release of the National Youth Commission's “Australia’s Homeless Youth” report on 8 April and ABC1’s premiere of The Oasis documentary on youth homelessness on 10 April, followed by a panel discussed hosted by Tony Jones. This report influenced the Australian Governments Green Paper Which Way Home? and the White Paper, which set out the Government's national plan of action.
The partnership with ABC Television was teamed with two major initiatives
funded by The Caledonia Foundation: 1) the National Youth Commission
(NYC) Report on Youth Homelessness; and 2) a comprehensive education
and outreach campaign.
The NYC Report was the result of an independent, national inquiry which
informed the range of evidence-based recommendations. In 2007, the NYC
held 21 days of hearings in all states and territories. Formal evidence was
given by 319 individuals and 91 written submissions were received, including
seven from government departments. The NYC report launched by Tanya Plibersek at Oasis in 2008 provided
context and credibility to images presented by the documentary, it showed
that the experience of The Oasis youth was representative of a greater
problem, not an isolated case.

The companion short films POLLY AND ME and WALL BOY involved Community Partners and Philanthropic Partners to widen the outreach of the films and broaden community discussion of the issues of addiction, abuse and neglect. The three films provoke much discussion about dealing with complex social problems, and raise issues about the adequacy of service levels surrounding prevention and response programs in the community.

An outreach and education initiative with The Caledonia Foundation launched Paul Kelly & The Portraits at the National Portrait Gallery by The Hon Tony Burke MP and Paul Kelly - Portrait of an Artist Schools' Education and Curriculum program by The Hon Peter Garrett AM and developed with the English Teachers Association NSW. The report Music to Our Ears with the Music Council of Australia was commissioned to increase parental engagement to advance music education in schools. The report Music to Our Ears with the Music Council of Australia was commissioned to increase parental engagement to advance music education in schools.

Distribution
Shark Island documentaries are available for home use online at their website, through ABC shops and distributors Roadshow Entertainment and Madman Entertainment.

References

External links

Documentary film production companies
Film production companies of Australia
Companies established in 2001
Companies based in Sydney
2001 establishments in Australia